Imanol Murga (born 1 January 1958) is a Spanish former professional racing cyclist. He rode in two editions of the Tour de France and six editions of the Vuelta a España.

References

External links
 

1958 births
Living people
Spanish male cyclists
Sportspeople from Vitoria-Gasteiz
Cyclists from the Basque Country (autonomous community)